Pierreodendron is a genus of plants in the family Simaroubaceae.

Its native range is western tropical Africa and is found in Angola, Benin, Cameroon, Congo, Gabon, Ghana, Ivory Coast, Liberia, Nigeria, Togo and Zaïre.

The genus name of Pierreodendron is in honour of Jean Baptiste Louis Pierre (1833–1905), a French botanist known for his Asian studies. 
It was first described and published in Bot. Jahrb. Syst. Vol.39 on page 575 in 1907.

Known species
According to Kew;
 Pierreodendron africanum (Hook.f.) Little
 Pierreodendron kerstingii (Engl.) Little

References

 
Sapindales genera
Taxonomy articles created by Polbot
Plants described in 1907
Flora of West Tropical Africa
Flora of West-Central Tropical Africa
Flora of Angola